QJ Peterson (born October 12, 1994) is an American professional basketball player for Nanjing Tongxi Monkey Kings of the CBA.

Early life
Peterson was born in Frederick, Maryland and was coached by Kelly Church at Hedgesville High School. He led the team to a State Championship, an achievement that has not been reached since 1971. He played at Massanutten Military Academy alongside seven Division One Players. Peterson received multiple offers from different colleges, signing with VMI on November 20, 2012.

College career
In his first game at VMI, Peterson scored 25 points against The Citadel. He averaged 19 points and 5.6 rebounds per game and was named to the Big South All-Freshman Team. Peterson suffered a mental breakdown in January 2015 and missed the rest of the season with a medical furlough. He returned to the team as a junior and averaged 19.6 points per game. Peterson declared for the 2016 NBA draft but returned to VMI. As a senior, Peterson was named to the First Team All-Southern Conference by the media and Second Team All-Conference by the coaches. He averaged 19.6 points, 6.5 rebounds, and 2.4 assists per game.

Professional career
Peterson signed his first professional contract with USK Praha on September 7, 2017. He averaged 21.5 points, 7.7 rebounds and 4.3 assists per game in six games. He signed with Anyang KGC on November 11, 2017. Peterson was selected by the Lakeland Magic in the first round of the 2018 NBA G League draft, but was waived in the preseason. On November 16, 2018, he signed with APOEL B.C. in Cyprus. In November 2019, Peterson signed with MBC Mykolaiv of the Ukrainian Basketball Superleague. He averaged 29.5 points per game as the top scorer in the Ukrainian League. On June 29, 2020, Peterson signed with the Bakken Bears. He received 2020-21 Basketligaen Most Valuable Player honors.

On July 9, 2021, he has signed with Gaziantep Basketbol of the Basketball Super League.

On July 17, 2022, Peterson reached a 1-year deal with Nanjing Tongxi Monkey Kings of the CBA.

References

External links
VMI Keydets bio

1994 births
Living people
American expatriate basketball people in the Czech Republic
American expatriate basketball people in Cyprus
American expatriate basketball people in Denmark
American expatriate basketball people in South Korea
American expatriate basketball people in Ukraine
American men's basketball players
Bakken Bears players
Basketball players from West Virginia
Gaziantep Basketbol players
MBC Mykolaiv players
Point guards
VMI Keydets basketball players